Aleksandr Sergeyevich Zakhlestin (born 7 July 1979) is a former Russian professional football player.

Club career
He played 3 seasons in the Russian Football National League for FC Sodovik Sterlitamak and FC Volga Ulyanovsk.

References

External links
 

1979 births
Sportspeople from Kirov, Kirov Oblast
Living people
Russian footballers
Association football defenders
FC Dynamo Kirov players
FC Sokol Saratov players
FC Sodovik Sterlitamak players
FC Volga Ulyanovsk players